Prince Vincent of Denmark, Count of Monpezat (Vincent Frederik Minik Alexander; born 8 January 2011) is a member of the Danish royal family. He is the third child and younger son of Crown Prince Frederik and Crown Princess Mary, the sixth grandchild and youngest grandson of Queen Margrethe II and Prince Henrik, and the older twin brother of Princess Josephine.

Vincent is fourth in line to the Danish throne, after his father, older brother Prince Christian and older sister, Princess Isabella.

Birth and early life

Prince Vincent was born at Rigshospitalet, the Copenhagen University Hospital, in Copenhagen, at 10:30 am local time, 26 minutes before his twin sister. Shortly after the birth, while speaking to the press, the Crown Prince joked about calling his newborn son Elvis, as the twins share a birthday with the "King of Rock and Roll". At noon on 8 January, a 21-gun salute was fired from the Sixtus Battery at Holmen Naval Base in Copenhagen and from Kronborg Castle in North Zealand to mark the arrival of a royal child.

Vincent and his sister were baptized on 14 April 2011, at the chapel of the Church of Holmen. His name was announced as Vincent Frederik Minik Alexander. His third name, Minik, is Greenlandic and means "earwax". His godparents are his maternal uncle, John Stuart Donaldson; his father's first cousin, the Prince of Sayn-Wittgenstein-Berleburg (then the Hereditary Prince); his mother's lady-in-waiting, Caroline Heering; and friends of his parents, the King of Spain (then the Prince of Asturias), Count Michael Ahlefeldt-Laurvig-Bille and Baroness Helle Reedtz-Thott.

In 2009, the Danish constitution was altered, granting absolute primogeniture to the Danish throne, meaning that the eldest child, regardless of gender, takes precedence in the line of succession. Under the old system of male-preference primogeniture, Vincent would have displaced his elder sister Isabella in the line of succession; with the new law, he comes directly after her instead.

On 15 August 2017, Vincent and his younger twin sister started school at Tranegårdsskolen in Gentofte – the same public school as their elder siblings.

Titles and styles

Vincent is styled as His Royal Highness Prince Vincent of Denmark, Count of Monpezat.

References

External links
 Official website

Danish princes
House of Monpezat
2011 births
Living people
Royal children
Counts of Monpezat
Danish twins
Danish people of Australian descent
Danish people of Scottish descent
Danish people of French descent